The Lamborghini Bravo is a concept car designed by Marcello Gandini at Bertone for Lamborghini. It was first presented in 1974 at the Turin Auto Show.

The Bravo was designed to showcase ideas for a replacement to the Urraco. It was never put into production, but many styling features were inspired by the Countach, including the angular features and the window arrangement.

The Bravo was sold at auction for €588,000 on 21 May 2011. The Bravo has had several different paints, first a pearlescent yellow, then green, followed by champagne and lastly white.

References

Bravo
Bertone concept vehicles

Rear mid-engine, rear-wheel-drive vehicles